Novokutovo (Yañı Qoto) is a rural locality (a selo) and the administrative centre of Novokutovsky Selsoviet, Chekmagushevsky District, Bashkortostan, Russia. The population was 542 as of 2010. There are 8 streets.

Geography 
Novokutovo is located 9 km northwest of Chekmagush (the district's administrative centre) by road. Bikmetovo is the nearest rural locality.

References 

Rural localities in Chekmagushevsky District